Anna Hontar is a Ukrainian Paralympic swimmer. In 2020, she won bronze in the S6 category.

References

Living people
Ukrainian female freestyle swimmers
Paralympic swimmers of Ukraine
S6-classified Paralympic swimmers
Paralympic medalists in swimming
Paralympic bronze medalists for Ukraine
Swimmers at the 2020 Summer Paralympics
Medalists at the 2020 Summer Paralympics
Medalists at the World Para Swimming Championships
Year of birth missing (living people)